Spanish Affair is a 2014 Spanish comedy film directed by Emilio Martínez-Lázaro. It premiered in Spain on 14 March 2014. Six weeks after its release, it became the second biggest box office hit ever in Spain, behind Avatar.

Plot
Rafa (Dani Rovira) has never left his native Seville, Andalusia, until he meets a Basque girl named Amaia (Clara Lago), who resists his seduction techniques. Against his friends' advice, he follows her to the Basque Country after she stays the night in his house and forgets her purse. A series of misunderstandings forces Rafa to impersonate a Basque boasting of a stock featuring eight traditional Basque surnames (Gabilondo, Urdangarín, Zubizarreta, Arguiñano from the father and Igartiburu, Erentxun, Otegi and Clemente from the mother, even though Clemente is not authentically Basque), and he gets more and more entangled in that character in order to please Amaia.

Cast

Box office
The weekend of its premiere, the film gathered an audience of 404,020 which resulted in box office grossing of 2.72 million euros. On its second weekend its grossing increased by 56%, third best behind The Impossible and Avatar in its first ten days with a total 4.4 million euros. By April it became the most watched Spanish film in Spain with more than 6.5 million viewers and the second film with the greatest box office grossing in Spain, only behind Avatar, with a box-office of more than 45 million euros (more than 62 million dollars). It has grossed  in Spain and a total of  internationally.

Critical reception 
The critics were divided about the film, but were mostly positive. For magazine Cinemanía, Carlos Marañón stressed that the movie was "extremely funny". This comment was repeated in many reviews that highlighted the film is "funny", and for some, "inspired and bright". Federico Marín Bellón journalist of  ABC, spoke of a "brave and timely movie", highlighting another aspect, the opportunity of its theme, which has also been emphasized by most critics who often compared it to the French film Welcome to the Sticks. Writing for daily newspaper El País, Borja Valero even predicted it could be the movie of the year.

Regarding the actors, in general, the work of the cast has been well received by critics .

On the negative side, Luis Martínez from El Mundo, said that the film is "a bad comedy" while Jordi Costa, from El País, said the development was irregular and ended catastrophically. Fausto Fernández, in the magazine Fotogramas, labelled it as impersonal and described its development as flat.

Accolades

|-
| rowspan = 14 align = "center" | 2015
| rowspan = "2" | 20th Forqué Awards || colspan = "2" | Best Fiction Feature Film ||  || rowspan = "2" | 
|-
| Best Actor || Karra Elejalde || 
|-
| rowspan=4 | 2nd Feroz Awards
| colspan=2 | Best Comedy
| 
| rowspan = 4 | 
|-
| Best Supporting Actor
| Karra Elejalde
| 
|-
| Best Supporting Actress
| Carmen Machi
| 
|-
| colspan=2 | Best Trailer
| 
|-
| rowspan=5 | 29th Goya Awards
| Best Supporting Actor
| Karra Elejalde
| 
| rowspan = 5 | 
|-
| Best Supporting Actress
| Carmen Machi
| 
|-
| Best New Actor
| Dani Rovira
| 
|-
| Best Cinematography
| Kalo Berridi
| 
|-
| Best Original Song
| "No te marches jamás" by Fernando Velázquez
| 
|-
| rowspan = "3" | 24th Actors and Actresses Union Awards || Best Film Actress in a Leading Role || Clara Lago ||  || rowspan = "3" | 
|-
| Best Film Actress in a Secondary Role || Carmen Machi || 
|-
| Best Film Actor in a Secondary Role || Karra Elejalde || 
|}

Sequel
A sequel, Ocho apellidos catalanes was released on 20 November 2015. Emilio Martínez-Lázaro repeated as director and Borja Cobeaga and Diego San José repeated as screenwriters. The original cast was joined by Berto Romero, Rosa Maria Sardà and Belén Cuesta.

Informational notes

References

2014 films
Spanish comedy films
2014 comedy films
Films produced by Álvaro Augustin
Films produced by Ghislain Barrois
Films produced by Javier Ugarte
Films set in the Basque County
Kowalski Films films
2010s Spanish films
2010s Spanish-language films